Baki Mercimek (born 17 September 1982 in Amsterdam) is a former footballer. Born in the Netherlands, he represented Turkey at international level.

Career 
He previously had spells with Sunderland AFC in England, for whom he never played a first team game, as well as Haarlem in the Netherlands, and Beşiktaş in Turkey.

Background 
Mercimek was born in Amsterdam. He was eligible to play for the Netherlands as well as Turkey. Mercimek stated that:"I have Turkish blood and I'd love to play for my country one day."

Honours

Club
Beşiktaş
Turkish Cup: 2006–07
Turkish Super Cup: 2006

References

External links
Profile at TFF.org

1982 births
Living people
Dutch footballers
Turkish footballers
Turkey B international footballers
Sunderland A.F.C. players
Turkish expatriate sportspeople in England
Beşiktaş J.K. footballers
Gençlerbirliği S.K. footballers
Dutch people of Turkish descent
Footballers from Amsterdam
HFC Haarlem players
Ankaraspor footballers
Süper Lig players
SC Telstar players
Association football defenders
Turkey international footballers